Velika Plana is a town and municipality in the Podunavlje District, Serbia.

Velika Plana may also refer to:

Croatia 
 , a village in the town of Gospić, Lika-Senj County

Serbia 
 Velika Plana (Prokuplje), a village in the municipality of Prokuplje, Toplica District

See also 
 Mala Plana (disambiguation)